Zyuzino is a rural locality (a selo) in Ikryaninsky District, Astrakhan Oblast, Russia. The population was 540 as of 2010. There are 12 streets.

Geography 
Zyuzino is located 48 km south of Ikryanoye (the district's administrative centre) by road. Mumra is the nearest rural locality.

References 

Rural localities in Ikryaninsky District